The Algeria men's national volleyball team represents Algeria in international volleyball competitions.

Results

Olympic Games
1992 — 12th place

World Championship
 1994 — 13th place
 1998 — 19th place

World Cup
1991 — 9th place

Men's African Volleyball Championship
1967 — 2nd place
1983 — 3rd place
1987 — 3rd place
1989 — 2nd place
1991 —  — Champion 
1993 —  — Champion 
1995 — 3rd place
1997 — 3rd place
1999 — 3rd place
2003 — 4th place
2009 — 2nd place
2011 — 4th place
2013 — 5th place
2015 — 4th place
2017 — 4th place 
2019 — 3rd place
2021 — did not enter

African Games
1978 — 3rd place
1987 — 2nd place
1991 —  — Champion 
2003 — 4th place
2007 — 3rd place
2011 — 2nd place
2015 —  — Champion 
2019 — 2nd place

Mediterranean Games
1991 — 8th place
1993 — 5th place
2013 — 6th place
2018 — 9th place
2022 — 9th place

Arab Volleyball Championship
1984 — 2nd place
1994 —  — champion 
1996 — 3rd place
1998 —  — Champion 
2000 — 2nd place
2002 — 2nd place
2006 — 3rd place
2008 — 4th place
2014 — 3rd place

Pan Arab Games
1997 —  — Champion
2004 — 2nd place
2011 — 3rd place

Squads at the 2022 Mediterranean games 

Team roster
Head coach: Mourad Sennoun

1 Ilyas Achouri 
2 Sofiane Bouyoucef 
3 Ahmed Amir Kerboua 
6 Mohamed Amine Oumessad 
7 Ali Kerboua WS
8 Boudjemaa Ikken 
9 Abderraouf Hamimes 
11 Soufiane Hosni WS
16 Islem Ould Cherchali 
17 Farouk Tizit WS
18 Billel Soualem WS
20 Youssouf Bourouba

2019 Men's African nations Championship

Players

References

Algeria team Competitions (fivb.org)

Volleyball
National men's volleyball teams
Volleyball in Algeria
Men's sport in Algeria